The Centre Colonels men's basketball team is an American college basketball team that represents Centre College in NCAA Division III. The Colonels are currently coached by Greg Mason. The team won several Southern Collegiate Athletic Conference titles. M. B. Banks and J. Quinn Decker once coached the team.

References

External links